Stidham United Methodist Church is a historic Methodist church located at Shadeland, Tippecanoe County, Indiana.  It was built in 1912–1913, and is a -story, co-axial plan Gothic Revival style brick building topped by a steeply sloped gable roof.  It features a crenellated bell tower with masonry buttresses and an American Craftsman style plain wood portico.

It was listed on the National Register of Historic Places in 1992.

References

Methodist churches in Indiana
Churches on the National Register of Historic Places in Indiana
Gothic Revival church buildings in Indiana
Churches completed in 1913
Churches in Tippecanoe County, Indiana
National Register of Historic Places in Tippecanoe County, Indiana